Hurricane Katrina was a devastating tropical cyclone that had a long and complex meteorological history, spanning a month from August 8 to September 7, 2005. Katrina's origins can be traced to the mid-level remnants of Tropical Depression Ten, a tropical wave, and an upper tropospheric trough. The former system emerged as a wave off West Africa on August 8, the second on August 11, while the third came into play between August 17 and 23. The mid-level remnants of Ten merged with the second tropical wave on August 19 while located north of Hispaniola. Subsequent interaction with the trough spurred convective development and a new tropical depression formed over the Bahamas on August 23. Deep convection soon blossomed and following the development of banding features, the system intensified into a tropical storm. Shifting steering currents the following day caused the intensifying system to turn west toward South Florida. After intensifying into a hurricane, Katrina made its first landfall in the Miami Metropolitan Area on August 25.

The flat terrain of The Everglades did little to disrupt the core of Katrina, only leading to slight weakening before the cyclone emerged over the Gulf of Mexico. There, exceptionally favorable environmental conditions consisting of high sea surface temperatures, low wind shear, expansive outflow, and high ocean heat content fueled two periods of rapid intensification. Punctuated by an eyewall replacement cycle on August 27 that dramatically expanded the hurricane's size, Katrina ultimately reached its peak strength as a Category 5 hurricane on the Saffir-Simpson Scale on August 28. Its maximum sustained winds reached 175 mph (280 km/h) and its pressure fell to 902 mbar (hPa; 26.63 inHg), ranking it among the strongest ever recorded in the Gulf of Mexico. As the hurricane turned north toward Louisiana, it steadily weakened but continued to expand in size.

Katrina made two landfalls in southeastern Louisiana on August 29 as a Category 3 hurricane, resulting in one of the greatest catastrophes in modern times in the United States. A record-breaking storm surge and destructive winds decimated coastal communities of Louisiana and Mississippi while the collapse of levees in New Orleans led to a prolonged humanitarian crisis. Nearly 1,400 people died directly or indirectly from the hurricane and damage totaled $125 billion. As the hurricane moved inland it quickly weakened, degrading below tropical storm strength over the Ohio River Valley on August 30. It was soon absorbed by or merged with a cold front in the region the next day. Thereafter the remnants progressed northeast as an extratropical cyclone. It briefly deepened and stalled over Quebec, Canada, in early September before resuming its forward motion. The cyclone ultimately dissipated in its entirety on September 7 near Greenland.

Origins

The origins of Hurricane Katrina are complex and involve the interaction of three systems: a tropical wave, the remnants of Tropical Depression Ten, and an upper tropospheric trough. On August 8, 2005, a tropical wave emerged over the Atlantic Ocean off the coast of West Africa. A second wave emerged over the Atlantic on August 11. The former system gradually organized and became Tropical Depression Ten on August 13 while located 1,065 mi (1,715 km) east of Barbados. Strong wind shear produced by an upper tropospheric trough over the western Atlantic caused the system to quickly degrade into a remnant low as it progressed west-northwest. A subsequent convective burst caused its low- and mid-level circulations to detach, with the latter lagging behind. Tropical Depression Ten's remnant vorticity continued west and dissipated near Cuba on August 21. During operational analyses by the National Hurricane Center (NHC), there was uncertainty over the degree of involvement with ex-Ten and the eventual formation of Katrina; however, thorough analysis determined them to be two separate systems. The slower-moving mid-level feature was overtaken by the second tropical wave on August 19. This spurred the formation of widespread, disorganized convection north of Puerto Rico. Moving slowly-west-northwest, this feature gradually consolidated as it moved north of Hispaniola to a position east of the Turks and Caicos on August 22.

The upper-tropospheric trough draped across the western Atlantic in the week leading to Katrina's formation provided the final factor leading to the hurricane's genesis. Low-level vorticity associated with this feature led to persistent convection over Cuba and Hispaniola from August 17 to 23, with locally enhanced instability allowing for its persistence. The mid-level remnant of Tropical Depression Ten and the second tropical wave interacted with this trough on August 22, triggering further development of convection. A vorticity maximum then developed over Hispaniola and progressed northeast over the Bahamas. The upper-tropospheric trough subsequently propagated west toward Florida, leading to a relaxation in wind shear over the developing cyclone. This spurred further cyclogensis and the disturbance finally became Tropical Depression Twelve around 12:00 UTC on August 23 while located about 200 mi (325 km) southeast of Nassau.

Initial development and Florida landfall

During its nascent stages, Tropical Depression Twelve moved slowly northwest in response to a subtropical ridge over the central Atlantic. Convection deepened throughout August 23 into August 24—with some cloud tops reaching —and a defined banding feature began wrapping around the northern side of the depression. Based on aircraft reconnaissance data, the NHC assessed the depression to have intensified into a tropical storm over the central Bahamas by 12:00 UTC. At this time it was assigned the name Katrina, the eleventh named storm of the annual hurricane season. Katrina turned north-northwest through a weakness in the subtropical ridge as it organized. The center was also pulled north as it gravitated toward convective bursts to the north. Multiple mesovortices were present within these bursts. An upper-level anticyclone became established over the tropical storm during the latter half of August 24, providing Katrina with symmetrical outflow. Banding features subsequently expanded around the cyclone. By August 25, the subtropical ridge moved farther east and ceased being a factor in Katrina's movement. A new ridge along the United States Gulf Coast takes its place and caused the tropical cyclone to turn west toward Florida.

An increase in wind shear kept the storm's structure asymmetric, pushing dry air into its circulation, with the strongest convection displaced to the south and east, but did not become strong enough to significantly disrupt it. The warm waters of the Gulf Stream fueled persistent convection as Katrina approached Florida. An eye-like feature began developing during the latter half of August 25. Katrina intensified into a Category 1 hurricane on the Saffir-Simpson Scale (SSHS) around 21:00 UTC. The upper-level ridge strengthened slightly as Katrina approached South Florida, causing the hurricane to turn west-southwest. This was contrary to the NHC's forecast at the time which had Katrina maintaining a west-northwest to northwest trajectory across the Florida Peninsula and later the Florida Panhandle. Southerly inflow over the warm coastal waters fueled intense convection and enabled further strengthening.

The hurricane soon developed a well-defined eye about 25 mi (40 km) in diameter and made landfall at 22:30 UTC along the Miami-Dade/Broward County line. At this time, the storm had maximum sustained winds of 80 mph (130 km/h) and a central pressure of 984 mbar (hPa; 29.06 inHg). A minor storm surge occurred along the southeastern Florida coast. While traversing Monroe County, Katrina briefly weakened to a tropical storm before emerging over the Gulf of Mexico around 05:00 UTC on August 26. The low-lying, swampy terrain of the Everglades had little effect on Katrina's structure and its overall appearance improved as it traversed the Peninsula; meteorologists described it as "still...an impressive cyclone." The lack of terrain-related shear and higher latent heat releases compared to non-swampy terrain enabled this to take place.

Rapid intensification and peak strength

Emerging over the Gulf of Mexico around 05:00 UTC on August 26, Katrina quickly regained strength and became a hurricane just one hour later. A strong rainband along the southern side of the storm produced torrential rains and strong winds across the Florida Keys. An expansive upper-level anticylcone "dominated the entire Gulf of Mexico", producing an environment of low wind shear and ample outflow. Two warm-core eddies, which broke off the Gulf Loop Current, with temperatures exceeding  were present. These warm waters led to increasing heat flux in the northeastern quadrant of the hurricane. Furthermore, Noel Davidson et al. (2008) hypothesized that an upstream Rossby wave influenced this intensification. With such favorable conditions, Katrina underwent two periods of rapid intensification from August 26 to 28, punctuated by an 18-hour pause on August 27. Of the five primary factors for rapid intensification described by Kaplan and DeMaria (2003), conditions were optimal for four of them.

From 06:00 UTC on August 27 to 12:00 UTC the next day, Katrina's maximum sustained winds increased from 75 mph (120 km/h) to 115 mph (185 km/h), marking its intensification to a Category 3 hurricane on the SSHS. A well-defined eye developed during this time. Significant lightning outbursts occurred in Katrina's eyewall throughout the rapid intensification phase. Throughout the remainder of August 27, Katrina's intensity plateaued as an eyewall replacement cycle took place. Its inner eyewall collapsed as a larger one formed around it and subsequently contracted by the morning of August 28. During this cycle Katrina's overall size expanded dramatically, nearly doubling by the end of the day, with tropical storm-force winds extended up to 160 mi (260 km) from its center. Upwelling of cold-core eddies occurred in the hurricane's wake, with SSTs falling by  near the Florida Keys.

During the pause in Katrina's intensification on August 27, inner-core convection weakened and the storm's overall structure became more asymmetric. The ridge that previously kept the hurricane on a west-southwest trajectory shifted east, causing Katrina to turn due west and later west-northwest on August 28. This took the hurricane over the Gulf of Mexico's ocean heat content (OHC) maximum, providing ample fuel for intensification. Following the consolidation of its new eye, Katrina underwent a second, more intense period of rapid strengthening while still continuing to grow in size. Within a 12-hour period, the storm's winds rose from 115 mph (185 km/h) to 165 mph (265 km/h) as it reached Category 5 hurricane status on the SSHS. Its central pressure fell by 32 mbar (hPa; 0.94 inHg) during the same time. By the latter half of August 28 Katrina became "exceptionally large", with tropical storm-force and hurricane-force winds extended 230 mi (370 km) and 105 mi (165 km) from its center, respectively. As during the first rapid intensification period, lightning was observed in the eyewall. Throughout both lightning outbreaks, a total of 684 strikes were detected. Despite occurring over a longer duration, the electrical activity was less than what was detected in Hurricane Rita. Katrina reached its peak intensity with maximum sustained winds of 175 mph (280 km/h) and a central pressure of 902 mbar (hPa; 26.63 inHg) around 18:00 UTC. Katrina's estimated intensity was primarily based on this observation, with a 90 percent rule of thumb reduction used to calibrate for surface-level equivalence. At the time, Katrina's pressure ranked as the fifth-lowest on record in the Atlantic basin and the second-lowest in the Gulf of Mexico.

Gulf Coast landfalls

Late on August 28, another eyewall replacement cycle began as Katrina turned due north toward Louisiana. However, this cycle was interrupted by an increase in wind shear and entrainment of dry air. As the inner eyewall collapsed, the outer one failed to consolidate as convection diminished on the western side of the hurricane. Accordingly, the hurricane dramatically weakened during the overnight hours of August 28 into August 29. Furthermore, increased interaction with land—creating additional friction-based shear—could have contributed to this weakening. A study by Edward Rappaport et al. published in the Weather and Forecasting in 2010 indicated that large hurricanes, especially intense ones, in the Gulf of Mexico often weaken significantly before landfall. A significant factor in this is the notable reduction of OHC over the northern Gulf compared to the central Gulf. As large hurricanes move into this area, upwelling becomes more pronounced and SSTs typically drop by  underneath the hurricane. Katrina fell below Category 5 status before 06:00 UTC and continued weakening to a low-end Category 4 hurricane by 09:00 UTC. Given the hurricane's approximate 30–35 mi (45–55 km) radius of maximum wind, the NHC indicated sustained Category 4 winds may have briefly occurred along the extreme southeastern coast of Louisiana. At 11:10 UTC, the storm made landfall near Buras, Louisiana. Based on analysis of aircraft reconnaissance data, the NHC estimated Katrina to have moved ashore with maximum winds of 125 mph (205 km/h) and a central pressure of 920 mbar (hPa; 27.17 inHg). Based on central pressure, Katrina was the third-most intense hurricane to strike the continental United States at the time.

Katrina weakened further as it crossed the Breton Sound, eventually making its final landfall near along the Louisiana–Mississippi border at 14:45 UTC. By this time, Katrina's maximum winds fell to 120 mph (195 km/h) and its central pressure rose to 928 mbar (hPa; 27.40 inHg). Land-based measurements of Katrina's winds are incomplete in the landfall regions; anemometers failed either due to power outages or storm surge hours before the onset of the strongest winds. Located on the western side of Katrina, New Orleans experienced weaker winds. The NHC estimated the city likely experienced sustained Category 1– to Category 2–force winds. As winds increase with elevation, the high-rise buildings of the city may have experienced Category 2– to Category 3–force winds.

Landfall forecast

Upon entering the Gulf of Mexico, it became clear to forecasters at the NHC that Katrina was tracking significantly more west of the originally expected landfall in the Florida Panhandle and posed an imminent threat to Louisiana and Mississippi. They shifted their forecast path 170 mi (275 km) west during the afternoon of August 26 to the Mississippi/Alabama border and further to Louisiana and Mississippi that night. NHC director Max Mayfield called "[the one] we’ve been talking about all of these years," referencing the long-talked of worst-case scenario for New Orleans called "The Big One". Mayfield personally called the governors of Louisiana and Mississippi emphasizing the catastrophic threat the storm posed, something he had only done once before in his 33-year career. By the morning of August 27, forecasters anticipated a direct hit on New Orleans. Following the westward shift, the NHC's forecasts were "exceptionally accurate and consistent". Landfall as a major hurricane was accurately pegged three days ahead of time. Track forecast errors were less than half of the 10-year average for 2005. Four- to five-day errors were slightly larger than the shorter-term overall; however, this was largely related to the west-southwest track shift across the Florida Panhandle rather than Katrina's path in the days leading up to landfall along the Gulf Coast.

Storm surge

Hurricane Katrina produced a catastrophic storm surge across coastal Alabama, Louisiana, and Mississippi. The largest surge occurred in the right-front quadrant of the hurricane in Mississippi. This was the largest storm surge observed in modern history in the United States. The massive surge despite Katrina's weakening state as it moved ashore is attributed to its intensity the day prior and immense size. Northward swells propagated ahead of the hurricane and enhanced water levels. The hurricane's perpendicular movement toward the coast across the shallow continental shelf further enhanced the surge. This was the largest such measurement from a NDBC buoy on record. On the west side of the eye, northerly winds generated significant water rises along the south shores of Lake Pontchartrain. Surge heights reached  in New Orleans, St. Bernard and Plaquemines parishes. New Orleans' levee system was overwhelmed by the rising waters, with overtopping occurring in many locations. This overtopping subsequently undermined the backside of the levees and caused their failure. The ensuing floods ultimately inundated 80 percent of New Orleans, with flood waters persisting until October 11.

Prior to Katrina, little emphasis was placed on the size of a hurricane in relation to the storm surge it would produce. Subsequent studies spurred by Katrina's devastation found significant correlation between storm size and surge. A 2008 study published in the Journal of Physical Oceanography found that surge values could differ as much as 30 percent of storms with similar intensities but different sizes. The paper asserted that the Saffir-Simpson scale was not a good indicator of coastal surge. As a direct result of Katrina and subsequent storms which produced large storm surges, the NHC revised the SSHS in 2010 to remove expected surge values and created a new product to convey forecast surge heights. A 2014 study published in Earth Interactions showed strong correlation between the radius of a system's storm- and hurricane-force winds 18 hours before landfall and storm surge heights.

Tornado outbreak and dissipation

Throughout Katrina's progression across the United States, it produced a significant tornado outbreak with 57 tornadoes touching down across 8 states from August 26 to 31. The strongest of these were rated F2: one on August 26 and five on August 29. Most of the tornadoes occurred in the hurricane's right-front quadrant, where strong low-level wind shear, high moisture content, and low convective available potential energy combined to produce locally favorable tornadic conditions. The most prolific activity occurred on August 29 with 39 confirmed tornadoes; 18 of these were in Georgia, a daily record for the month of August. A study published in 2008 documented 23 supercells in the six hours leading up to Katrina's landfall in Louisiana. Localized winds within mesovortices may have reached Category 4 hurricane-equivalent intensity. Contrary to previous studies, the majority of these remained over water.

Once onshore, Katrina rapidly weakened as it traversed Mississippi. Its winds subsided below hurricane-force by 00:00 UTC on August 30 as its center passed northwest of Meridian. Interaction with an upstream trough caused Katrina to turn northeast across the Tennessee Valley and Ohio River Valley on August 30. The storm degraded to a tropical depression by 12:00 UTC. Strong westerly shear produced by the trough caused Katrina's upper-level anticyclone to break away from the low-level circulation on August 30. This led to a "forceful removal" of the storm's warm core which in turn caused a near-instantaneous transition into an extratropical cyclone that day.August 30. The NHC assessed Katrina's dissipation as a distinct entity by 12:00 UTC on August 31 as it was absorbed into the aforementioned frontal boundary over central Ohio. The dissociated anticyclone became positioned off the East Coast of the United States as it interacted with the upstream trough. This feature produced anomalous southerly flow across eastern North America through early September. Ex-Katrina continued across Pennsylvania and New York, eventually crossing the St. Lawrence River into southeastern Canada the next day. A stationary low to the north over James Bay caused ex-Katrina to turn north and meander over Quebec for several days. The storm deepened slightly during this time, with its central pressure falling by 10 mbar (hPa; 0.29 inHg), though its winds did not increase. By September 3, the system acquired a more northeasterly to easterly heading, crossing over Newfoundland and Labrador and then emerging over the Labrador Sea on September 4. The degrading system continued east and ultimately dissipated off the southern tip of Greenland on September 7.

Notes

See also

List of Category 5 Atlantic hurricanes

References

Sources

 

Hurricane Katrina
Katrina
Articles containing video clips
Katrina meteorological history